Michel Goulet  (born August 4, 1944) is a Canadian sculptor.

Born in Asbestos, Quebec, Goulet has been a professor at Université du Québec à Montréal since 1987. Michel Goulet is represented by the Christopher Cutts Gallery in Toronto, ON.

Works

Honours 
1990: Prix Paul-Émile-Borduas
1994:  Quebec Theatre Critic's Association prize for best scenography

2008: Governor General's Awards in Visual and Media Arts

References 

1944 births
20th-century Canadian sculptors
Canadian male sculptors
20th-century Canadian male artists
21st-century sculptors
French Quebecers
Living people
Members of the Order of Canada
People from Val-des-Sources
Sculptors from Quebec
Canadian contemporary artists
Governor General's Award in Visual and Media Arts winners
Members of the Royal Canadian Academy of Arts